Shah Abdullah alias Shah Ghulam Ali Dehlavi (1743–1824, Urdu:) was a Sufi Shaykh in Delhi during the early 19th century. He was a master of the Naqshbandi tradition and in other Sufi orders such as Chishti.

Biography
He was born in 1156 AH (1743 C.E.) in Patiala, Punjab, in present-day India. His father was Shah Abdul-Latif, a scholar and Sufi shaykh belonging to the Qadri tariqah. It is reported in his biographies that his father had a dream before his birth in which he saw Sayyadna Ali, who told him to name the baby on his name (Ali). After he grew up, he modified his own name to be Ghulam Ali (literally meaning slave of Ali, a common name in Indian Muslims today). Similarly, his mother had a dream in which she saw Muhammad, who told her to name the baby Abdullah. Hence his real name is still known as Abdullah while his alias is Ghulam Ali.

He is reported to have memorized the Quran in a single month's duration. In 1170 AH he came to Delhi to take the oath of allegiance to Mirza Mazhar Jan-e-Janaan, who was a famous Shaykh of Naqshbandi tariqah in Delhi at that time. After getting trained in the major Sufi orders including Naqshbandi for 15 years, he received complete Khilafat (spiritual Ijazah) from his Shaykh.

He had many Khulafa (deputies) who spread the Naqshbandi Sufi order to a vast number of people in the whole Muslim world at that time. His Khulafa went to Bukhara, Baghdad, Madinah and Turkey. His famous khalifa was Mawlana Khalid al-Baghdadi, who had hundreds of thousands of followers in his lifetime, and many Naqshbandi's today in Turkey and nearby countries follow him. His chief deputy and successor was [Hafiz Abu-Saeed-Ahmadi Faruqi Mujaddidi Naqshbandi]] (Delhi) and his next successor was Hafiz Shah Ahmed Saeed Faruqi Mujaddidi, son of Hafiz Shah Abu Saeed (Medina) 

He is quoted to have said: "My Faid (spirituality) has reached far off countries. Our Halqa is held in Makkah and our Halqa is held in Madinah. Similarly our Halqa is held in Baghdad, Rome (now Turkey and Cyprus) and Maghrib (Parts of Europe and Africa facing Asia). And Bukhara is our parental home."

He died on 22 Safar 1240 AH (15/16 October 1824) and was buried alongside his Shaykh's grave in Khanqah Mirja in Delhi.

Writings
He wrote books, the best known being Mazhari in Persian, which is a complete biography of his shaykh Mirza Mazhar Jan-e-Janaan Shaheed.

His other books are:
 Edah-e-Tariqat
 Ahwal-e-Buzurgaan
 Risalah dar Tariqah Ba'yat wa Azkar
 Risalah dar Tariqah Naqshband
 Risalah Sitri Chand dar Ahwal-e-Shah-e-Naqshband
 Risalah-e-Azkar
 Risalah-e-Muraqbat
 Risalah dar Aitarazat Shaykh Abdul-Haq bar Hazrat Mujaddid
 Risalah Mashgooliyah
 Sulook Raqia Naqshbandia
 Makateeb Shareefa (collection of his letters)
 Kamalat-e-Mazhariya
 Malfoozat-e-Sharifa

Naqshbandi chainThe Golden Chains of Ghulam Ali Dehlavi on maktabah.org website Published 3 April 2011, Retrieved 16 August 2018

Qadri chain
Extracted from Maqamat Mazhari by Shah Ghulam Ali Dehlavi

 Shah Ghulam Ali Dehlavi
 Mirza Mazhar Jan-e-Janaan
 Muhammad Abid Sanami
 Abdul Ahad
 Muhammad Said
 Ahmed Sirhindi 
 Abdul Ahad Faruqi
 Shah Kamal Kethali
 Shah Fuzail
 Gada e Rahman Sani
 Shamsuddin Arif
 Gada e Rahman Awal
 Shamsuddin Sehrai
 Aqeel
 Abdul Wahhab
 Sharfuddin
 Abdur Razzaq
 Abdul-Qadir Gilani

Chishti chain
Extracted from Maqamat Mazhari by Shah Ghulam Ali Dehlavi

 Shah Ghulam Ali Dehlvi
 Mirza Mazhar Jan-e-Janaan
 Muhammad Abid Sanami
 Abdul Ahad Sirhindi
 Muhammad Said
 Ahmed Sirhindi
 Abdul Ahad Faruqi
 Ruknuddin
 Abdul Quddus Gangohi
 Muhammad Arif
 Ahmed Abdul Haq
 Jalaluddin Panipati
 Shamsuddin Turk
 Alauddin Sabir Kaliyari
 Fariduddin Ganjshakar
 Qutbuddin Bakhtiar Kaki
 Khwaja Moinuddin Chishti

His Khulafa
His Khulafa were numerous and many of them were prominent Shaykhs at their times. Following is a list of his most prominent Khulafa as extracted from various sources.

 Mawlana Hafiz Abu-Saeed-Ahmadi Faruqi Mujaddidi Naqshbandi, his successor (Delhi)
 Mawlana Hafiz Shah Ahmed Saeed Faruqi Mujaddidi, son of Hafiz Shah Abu Saeed (Medina)
 Shah Rauf Ahmed Raaft Faruqi Mujaddidi Rampuri (Bhopal)
 Mawlana Khalid al-Baghdadi al-Kurdi al-Rumi (Turkey)
 Mawlana Ismaeel Madani (Medina)
 Mawlana Ghulam Mohiuddin Qusoori
 Mawlana Bashartullah Behra'ichi
 Mawlana Shah Gul Muhammad Ghaznavi (Bukhara)
 Mawlana Muhammad Sharif (Sirhind)
 Mawlana Pir Muhammad (Kashmir)
 Mawlana Jan Muhammad (Herat)
 Mawlana Muhammad Jan (Makkah, d.1266 AH), whose Khulafa spread up to Turkey
 Shah Saad'ullah Naqshbandi (Hyderabad)

References

External links 
 Maqamat Mazhari (Urdu translation) by Shah Ghulam Ali Dehlavi: Biography of his shaykh Mirza Mazhar Jan-e-Janaan
 'Halate Mashayekhe Naqshbandiya Mujaddediya' written by mawlana muhammad hasan naqshbandi mujaddedi.first published march,1982.(1402hz).'Narinda khanka Sharif'

1743 births
1824 deaths
People from Patiala
Hanafis
Maturidis
Naqshbandi order
Indian Sufi saints
Sufi teachers
18th-century Muslim scholars of Islam
Indian Sunni Muslim scholars of Islam